The Baltimore Harbor Light, officially Baltimore Light and historically Baltimore Harbor Lighthouse is a privately owned caisson lighthouse in the Chesapeake Bay in Maryland. First lit in 1908, it sits at the mouth of the Magothy River, marking the channel which leads northwest to the opening of the Patapsco River, which then leads into the Baltimore harbor. The light is located adjacent to the mouth of the Magothy River. At the time of its construction, it was the world's tallest caisson lighthouse. In June 2006, Baltimore Light was sold at auction to private owners by the General Services Administration for $260,000; the U.S. Coast Guard maintains rights to operate a light on the structure.

Although a lighthouse had been requested at the site since 1890, it was not until 1904 that construction actually began. In October of that year a violent storm struck the construction site, upturning the caisson and sending it to the bottom of the Bay. The contractor defaulted on the work, and it was not until late in 1905 that construction could resume. The lens was finally installed and the light lit in 1908. It was the last lighthouse to be constructed on the Chesapeake.

In May 1964, the Baltimore Light became the first and only American lighthouse powered by nuclear power, as a test of the SNAP-7B 60 Watt radioisotope thermoelectric generator. One year later the RTG was removed and a conventional electric generator was installed. Currently the lighthouse is solar-powered.

The structure was added to the National Register of Historic Places as Baltimore Light Station on December 2, 2002.

Notes

References
Baltimore Harbor Lighthouse, from the Chesapeake Chapter of the United States Lighthouse Society.
History of Baltimore Lighthouse, from Lighthousefriends.

External links

, including photo from 1991, at Maryland Historical Trust
Baltimore Harbor Light. New owners as of 2006.
Chesapeake Bay Lighthouse Project - Baltimore Light

Lighthouses completed in 1908
Lighthouses on the National Register of Historic Places in Maryland
Lighthouses in Anne Arundel County, Maryland
National Register of Historic Places in Anne Arundel County, Maryland
1908 establishments in Maryland